Shooting Festival in Schilda (German: Schützenfest in Schilda) is a 1931 German comedy film directed by Adolf Trotz and starring Sig Arno, Fritz Kampers and Eugen Rex.

Cast
 Sig Arno
 Fritz Kampers
 Eugen Rex
 Hans Wassmann
 Ida Wüst
 Margot Landa
 Genia Nikolaieva
 Evi Eva
 Betty Astor
 Nastia Latka
 Julius Falkenstein
 Willy Prager
 Johannes Roth

References

Bibliography
 Bock, Hans-Michael & Bergfelder, Tim. The Concise CineGraph. Encyclopedia of German Cinema. Berghahn Books, 2009.

External links

1931 films
1931 comedy films
German comedy films
Films of the Weimar Republic
1930s German-language films
Films directed by Adolf Trotz
German black-and-white films
1930s German films